Richard McLaren may refer to:
 Richard Wellington McLaren (1918–1976), United States federal judge
 Richard Lance McLaren, see Republic of Texas (group)
 Richard McLaren (academic) (born 1945), Canadian academic and sports lawyer